John Jurasek (born June 21, 1997), better known online as Reviewbrah, is an American YouTube personality, food critic and radio host. Jurasek reviews fast food, frozen meals, and energy drinks on his YouTube channel TheReportOfTheWeek, and hosts a radio show on shortwave radio, Spotify, TuneIn, and SoundCloud. He has been featured by several media outlets, including CNN Money, New York Magazine, and Lenta.ru. Jurasek was also a guest on The Needle Drop Podcast in October 2015 and made an appearance on an episode of the television program Tosh.0 in March 2016.

YouTube
Establishing his YouTube channel in 2011, Jurasek's initial focus was on a series of energy drink reviews known as Energy Crisis. He has since diversified to include a food review series, Running On Empty, which focuses on fast food and frozen ready-made meals. A third unnamed series focuses on reviewing specialty drinks.

Jurasek's YouTube channel spiked in popularity when he uploaded a video titled Popeye's Cheddar Biscuit Butter Butterfly Shrimp - Food Review on July 4, 2017. In the video, he states: "My disappointment is immeasurable and my day is ruined," after taking a bite of Popeye's then-new menu item. The quote became an internet meme and helped give Jurasek's channel more fame. 

As of October 2022, Jurasek's YouTube channel, TheReportOfTheWeek, has over 2.7 million subscribers and 262 million views.

Regarding the type of food items featured in his reviews he has stated, "Is every average American going to be eating a steak dinner every night? No. Fast food though, well, there's usually a McDonald's every half-mile ... I want to be applicable to the largest number of people."

Radio
In addition to his YouTube offerings, Jurasek hosts a weekly shortwave radio program, VORW Radio International. The program has been transmitted primarily by WBCQ, WWCR, and WRMI. The program runs for around one hour and features commentary and listener-requested music. The show also features regular shoutouts, news discussion & correspondence to listener messages.

In Early 2022, VORW Radio International also expanded with a weekly radio airing for shortwave listeners in Eastern Europe & Russia, due to the ongoing conflict in the region.

As of February 2019, Jurasek has also begun uploading regular podcasts, recorded shortwave shows, and live streams to YouTube via his channel VORW Podcast, which has accumulated over 90,800 subscribers and 2 million views as of October 29, 2022.

References

External links 
 TheReportOfTheWeek on YouTube
 ThereportOfTheWeek on Social Blade

Living people
American YouTubers
American food writers
Radio personalities from Florida
People from New York (state)
People from Florida
Internet memes
Year of birth missing (living people)
American people of Czech descent
YouTube critics and reviewers